The Tarasque Type 53 T2 is a 20 mm anti-aircraft gun adopted by the French Army.  The Tarasque is based on the M693 F2 20 mm auto-cannon and mounted on a light two-wheeled trailer that can be towed by a jeep and brought into action in only 20 seconds.  The Tarasque can be used against both aerial and ground targets and there is a 5× magnification telescopic sight for use against ground targets and a 1× magnification sight for anti-aircraft use.  The Tarasque carriage is powered by an auxiliary hydraulic pump which provides power for both traverse and elevation.  As a backup the Tarasque can also be powered manually if the hydraulic system fails.

References
 Hogg, Ian. Twentieth-Century Artillery. New York: Barnes & Nobles, 2000. .
 The Encyclopedia of World Military Weapons. 1988.  .

Anti-aircraft guns of France